Spaniocentra hollowayi is a species of moth of the  family Geometridae. It is found in Taiwan and Japan.

The wingspan is 25–30 mm.

External links
Japanese Moths

Geometrinae
Moths of Japan
Moths of Taiwan